The Texas District is one of the 35 districts of the Lutheran Church–Missouri Synod (LCMS), and comprises the state of Texas with the exception of El Paso County, which is in the Rocky Mountain District. The Texas District includes approximately 360 congregations and missions (second to only the Michigan District), subdivided into 39 circuits, as well as 73 preschools, 41 elementary schools and 10 high schools. Baptized membership in district congregations is approximately 133,000.

The Texas District was formed in 1906 out of the Southern District, and at one time included congregations in southern New Mexico, but these were transferred to the Colorado District (since renamed the Rocky Mountain District) in 1941-42. District offices are located in Austin, Texas. Delegates from each congregation meet in convention every three years to elect the district president, vice presidents, circuit counselors, a board of directors, and other officers. The Rev. Michael W. Newman has been the district president since September 2018.

Concordia University Texas, part of the LCMS' Concordia University System, is located in Austin.

Presidents
Rev. Adolf W. Kramer, 1906–09
Rev. Charles A. Waech, 1909–12
Rev. Gotthilf Heinrich Wilhelm Birkmann, 1912–20
Rev. Henry Peter Studtmann, 1920–26
Rev. John W. Behnken, 1926–29
Rev. Constantin Martin Beyer, 1929–42
Rev. Edwin A. Heckmann, 1942–48
Rev. Oliver R. Harms, 1948–50
Rev. Roland P. Wiederaenders, 1950–59
Rev. Albert F. Jesse, 1959–63
Rev. Carl A. Heckmann, 1963–78
Rev. Glenn R. O'Shoney, 1978–89
Rev. Louis L. Pabor, 1989–91
Rev. Gerald B. Kieschnick, 1991–2001
Rev. James R. Linderman, 2001–06
Rev. Kenneth M. Hennings, 2006–18
Rev. Michael W. Newman, 2018-Present

References

External links
Texas District web site
LCMS: Texas District
LCMS Congregation Directory
Verhandlungen der ersten Jahresversammlung des Texas-Distrikts der Deutschen Ev.-Lutherischen Synode von Missouri, Ohio und Andern Staaten (1906–1919)

Lutheran Church–Missouri Synod districts
Protestantism in Texas
Christian organizations established in 1906
1906 establishments in Texas